Oleksiy Anatoliyovych Orzhel (born 26 January 1984) is a Ukrainian energy expert and politician. He was Minister of Energy and Environmental Protection of Ukraine from August 2019 to 4 March 2020.

Biography 
Orzhel graduated from the Institute of Energy Saving and Energy Management at the Kyiv Polytechnic Institute.

He was the Head of the Energy Sector at the Better Regulation Delivery Office. From 2006 to 2014, Orzhel worked at the National Commission for State Regulation of Energy and Public Utilities.

Head of the Ukrainian Association of Renewable Energy.

He was on a party list of the Servant of the People political party during the 2019 parliamentary elections, yet himself is not a registered member of the party (non-partisan, according to the Central Election Commission). Orzhel was elected to the Verkhovna Rada in 2019. He surrendered his deputy mandate upon his ministerial appointment on 29 August 2019.

See also 
 Honcharuk Government
 List of members of the parliament of Ukraine, 2019–24

References

External links 
 

1984 births
Living people
Politicians from Kyiv
Kyiv Polytechnic Institute alumni
Ninth convocation members of the Verkhovna Rada
Ministers of Energy of Ukraine
Preservation of natural environment ministers of Ukraine
Servant of the People (political party) politicians
21st-century Ukrainian politicians